Meri Jaan Hindustan is a 1997 Indian compilation album released on the 50th anniversary of Indian independence. The album featured various artists. It consisted of a total of eight songs.

Track listing 

The album consists of eight songs from its first release in 1997:

References 

Folk albums by Indian artists
1997 compilation albums
Hindi-language albums
World music albums by Indian artists